Earnhardt is the surname of the following people:

 An American auto racing family, almost all drivers:
 Ralph Earnhardt (1928–1973), family patriarch
 Dale Earnhardt Sr. (1951–2001), son of Ralph
 Teresa Earnhardt (born 1958), owner and CEO of Dale Earnhardt, Inc., widow of Dale Sr. and stepmother of Kerry and Dale Jr.
 Kerry Earnhardt (born 1969), Dale Sr.'s oldest son
 Dale Earnhardt Jr. (born 1974), the best-known of Dale Sr.'s sons
 Jeffrey Earnhardt (born 1989), son of Kerry
Leon Earnhardt (b. 2001), fictional racer from the Future GPX Cyber Formula series
Dr. Earnhardt, a fictional character from the 2012 video game Far Cry 3

See also
Dale Earnhardt, Inc. (DEI), a NASCAR racing team
Earnhardt Ganassi Racing, a NASCAR team and the result of a merger by DEI with Chip Ganassi Racing
3: The Dale Earnhardt Story, a TV movie
Earhart
Earheart